Jean Mauduit, stage name Larive or de La Rive (6 August 1747, in La Rochelle – 30 April 1827, in Montlignon) was a French actor.

Life
The son of a grocer, he left his father's home to devote himself to the theatre and presented himself to Lekain in Paris for a job.  Engaged in Madame Montansier's company, he played at Tours, then at Lyon, and came back to Paris where Mademoiselle Clairon took him under her protection.

Larive made his debut at the Comédie-Française on 3 December 1770 but was not well received.  He left for Brussels where D'Hannetaire engaged him for the lead rôles at the Théâtre de la Monnaie and where he spent 4 years, acting alongside Dazincourt, Grandmesnil and Florence.  It was here that he got to known his future wife, Eugénie D'Hannetaire, the director's eldest daughter, whom he married in Paris on 18 June 1776 (they divorced in 1794).  He was a friend of Voltaire and interpreted many of his lead roles.

On 29 April 1775, Larive made another first appearance at the Comédie-Française and was admitted as a sociétaire on the following 18 May.  Three years later, the death of Lekain put him in first place among the sociétaires.  He regularly toured the provinces and appeared in his birthplace in 1780, as well as in Lille, Geneva and Bordeaux.  He left the Comédie-Française in 1788 but returned to it in 1790, after appearing in Lille.

Supplanted by Talma, he was imprisoned several times during the French Revolution and retired to his property at Montlignon, becoming the town's mayor.

Works
Réflexions sur l'art théâtral (1801)
Cours de déclamation (1810)
These were both referred to by Louis Jouvet in his course at the Conservatoire.

See also 
 Troupe of the Comédie-Française in 1790

1747 births
1827 deaths
People from La Rochelle
French male stage actors
Sociétaires of the Comédie-Française
18th-century French male actors
19th-century French male actors
Mayors of places in Île-de-France